Julie Braun-Vogelstein (1883–1971) was a German-born American art historian, author, editor, and journalist.

Biography
She was born in Stettin in Germany (now Szczecin, Poland). Julie Vogelstein was the daughter of rabbi Heinemann Vogelstein and sister of rabbi :de:Hermann Vogelstein, and industrialists Ludwig Vogelstein and :de:Theodor Vogelstein. She studied art history and Egyptology at the University of Munich and University of Berlin. In 1919 she received her PhD from the University of Heidelberg. In 1935 she left Germany for France and later the United States. In 1936 she went to California, and she lived in Carmel from time-to-time thereafter. She was a member of the board of the Leo Baeck Institute.

She was the secretary of Heinrich Braun (1854–1927), and became his second wife after the death of his wife Lily Braun (1865–1916). She was also the editor of Lily Braun's Collected Works.

She wrote and edited many books; for example she wrote Art: The Image of the West (1952) and edited The Diary of Otto Braun (1924). Otto Braun was her stepson, who died in World War I.

Her husband died in 1927; they did not have any children. Braun-Vogelstein died in New York City. Services were held at Riverside Memorial Chapel.

References

External links
 Guide to the Julie Braun-Vogelstein Collection, 1743-1971, Leo Baeck Institute
 Literature by, edited by, and about Julie Braun-Vogelstein in the catalog of the German National Library (in German)

1883 births
1971 deaths
German art historians
German women journalists
Jewish women writers
Women art historians
German women historians
German emigrants to the United States
20th-century German journalists
American art historians
20th-century German women